Die Hausmeisterin is a German television series that originally aired in three seasons from 1987 to 1992. The storyline revolves around newly divorced Martha Haslbeck who works as a live in janitor at an apartment building located in the Haidhausen neighborhood of Munich.

See also
List of German television series

External links
 

1987 German television series debuts
1992 German television series endings
Television shows set in Munich
German-language television shows
Das Erste original programming
Grimme-Preis for fiction winners